Ilia Spanderashvili (born 10 September 1997) is a Georgian rugby union player. His position is flanker, and he currently plays for Penza in the Russian Rugby Championship and the Georgia national team. He was a captain of Georgia U20 in 2017, during the famous victory (26-25) against Argentina U20, scoring a try on 12th minute.

References

1997 births
Living people
Rugby union players from Georgia (country)
Rugby union flankers
Expatriate rugby union players from Georgia (country)
Expatriate sportspeople from Georgia (country) in England
Georgia international rugby union players
Lokomotiv Penza players